The 2018–19 Championnat National 2 is the 21st season of the fourth tier in the French football league system in its current format. The competition is contested by 64 clubs split geographically across 4 groups of 16 teams each. The teams included amateur clubs (although a few are semi-professional) and the reserve teams of professional clubs.

Teams
On 13 July, the FFF ratified the constitution of the competition, and published the groups as follows:

 49 clubs who were neither relegated or promoted from the 2017–18 Championnat National 2 groups.
 3 teams relegated from 2017–18 Championnat National (Les Herbiers, Marseille Consolat, Créteil). 
 12 teams promoted from 2017–18 Championnat National 3. (Bordeaux (res), Nantes (res), Blois, Endoume Marseille, Pontarlier, Haguenau, Nîmes (res), Feignies Aulnoye, Oissel, Vannes, Bobigny and Saint-Étienne (res)).

League tables

Group A

Group B

Group C

Group D

Season Outcomes

Champions and promotions
The champion of Championnat National 2 is decided by measuring performance of each group winner in matches against the top 6 clubs in their group.

Créteil are champions of 2018–19 Championnat National 2 and are promoted to 2019–20 Championnat National.

Le Puy, Toulon and Bastia-Borgo are promoted to 2019–20 Championnat National.

Relegation
Monaco (res), Pontarlier, Nice (res), Nîmes (res), Bordeaux (res), Mont-de-Marsan, Furiana-Agliani, Boulogne-Billancourt, Le Havre (res), Haguenau, Feignies Aulnoye and Arras finished in the relegation places and will be relegated to 2019–20 Championnat National 3 subject to any reprieves in the next section.

Reprieves
Any reprieves required due to administrative relegations, mergers or clubs folding are decided by taking, in order, the 14th placed clubs ranked by order of their record against clubs finishing 9th to 13th position in their group, followed by the 15th placed clubs ranked by order of their record against clubs finishing in 10th to 14th position in their group.

On 24 May 2019, Paris Saint-Germain (res) announced they would not be registering for Championnat National 2 next season, meaning an automatic reprieve for the best 14th placed team, Monaco (res).

Also on 24 May 2019, the body responsible for governance of clubs in French football, the DNCG, administratively relegated Mantes due to financial arrears. The club successfully appealed this decision on 3 July 2019.

On 4 June 2019, the DNCG administratively relegated Jura Sud, subject to appeal. The club successfully appealed this decision, as announced on 8 July 2019.

On 12 June 2019, the DNCG administratively relegated Martigues, subject to appeal. The club successfully appealed this decision on 3 July 2019.

On 25 June 2019, the DNCG administratively relegated Athlético Marseille, subject to appeal, and also gave Tours an administrative relegation on top of their relegation from Championnat National, subject to appeal. This was confirmed at appeal on 11 July 2019, confirming the reprieve of Nîmes (res).

On 11 July 2019, the DNCG appeal committee confirmed the earlier decision of the DNCG to give an administrative relegation to Tours FC in addition to their sporting relegation from 2018–19 Championnat National, meaning they will play in Championnat National 3 for the 2019–20 season, which causes the reprieve of Haguenau.

Best 14th placed team

Best 15th placed team

Top scorers

References 

2018-19
4
Fra